The Harry Vardon Trophy is awarded by the European Tour. Since 2009 it has been awarded to the winner of the Race to Dubai. Before then it was awarded to the winner of the "Order of Merit". From 1975 to 2008 the Order of Merit was based on prize money but before that date a points system was used. From 1937 until the European Tour became an independent organisation, the award was presented by the British PGA. The trophy is named for the Jersey golfing great Harry Vardon, who died in 1937.

The Race to Dubai is calculated in euro, although many of the events have prize funds which are fixed in other currencies, mainly pounds sterling or U.S. dollars. In these instances, the amounts are converted into euro at the exchange rate for the week that the tournament is played.

History
The award was created in 1937 as the Harry Vardon Memorial Trophy. In its first year the award was presented to the player with the best average in the major stroke play events. Seven events were used: Daily Mail Tournament, Silver King Tournament, Dunlop-Southport Tournament, Southend Tournament, Open Championship, Irish Open and News Chronicle Tournament. Qualifying rounds did not count and a minimum of 18 rounds had to be played. The Dunlop-Metropolitan Tournament with its restricted field was not included and so the last qualifying event was the delayed Southend Tournament. Charles Whitcombe became the first winner with an average of 71.62 for 24 rounds. He had played in 6 of the 7 events (all except the Irish Open) scoring 289, 289, 283, 294, 282 and 282 for a total of 1719. The Irish golfer Paddy Mahon was second with an average of 71.90.

Six events were used in 1938 with a minimum of 16 rounds which had to include The Open Championship. The same events were used as in 1937 with the exception of the Southend Tournament. Henry Cotton won the award with an average of 72.87 having played in 4 of the 6 qualifying events. Reg Whitcombe was second with an average of 73.35 for 20 rounds.

A new system was introduced in 1939. A points system was used with the winner getting 1 point, 2nd place getting 2 points, down to 26 points for finishing outside the top 25. Five events were used with a minimum of 16 rounds which had to include the four rounds of the Open Championship. The Dunlop-Southport Tournament did not take place but otherwise the same tournaments were used as in 1938. Reg Whitcombe won with a score of 27 (7th, 6th, 3rd, 2nd and 9th). Sam King was second on 49 which included 26 points because he had not played in the Irish Open. King had a lower average (72.87) than Whitcombe (73).

In 1946, after World War II, the award was again given to the player with the best average in the major stroke play events. 20 rounds were required and four rounds of the Open were compulsory. Bobby Locke won with an average of 73.16 in 36 rounds. Norman Von Nida won in 1947 with an average of 71.25 in 52 rounds and Charlie Ward won in 1948 averaging 71.29 over 44 rounds.

Winners

Before 1972 the Order of Merit had been based on a points system or stroke average, so it was not necessarily headed by the golfer who won the most money. In 1971 Peter Oosterhuis won the Order of Merit and won £9,269. Gary Player was the leading money winner with £11,281 but of that, £8,500 came from winning the 1971 Piccadilly World Match Play Championship.

Multiple winners

References

External links
Harry Vardon Trophy Honour Roll at www.pga.info
Harry Vardon Trophy winners at www.europeantour.com

European Tour
Golf awards
Awards established in 1937